Jonathan William White (born 21 August 1979) is a former English cricketer. White was a right-handed batsman who bowled left-arm medium pace.  He was born in Bristol.

White represented the Gloucestershire Cricket Board in List A cricket. His debut List A match came against the Yorkshire Cricket Board in the 1999 NatWest Trophy.  From 1999 to 2002, he represented the Board in seven List A matches, the last of which came against the Surrey Cricket Board in the 1st round of the 2003 Cheltenham & Gloucester Trophy played in 2002. In his five List A matches, he scored 58 runs at a batting average of 14.50, with a high score of 29. As bowler, he took 11 wickets at a bowling average of 15.63, with best figures of 4/14.

See also
Cricket in England
English cricketers

References

External links
Jonathan White at Cricinfo
Jonathan White at CricketArchive

1979 births
Living people
Cricketers from Bristol
English cricketers
Gloucestershire Cricket Board cricketers